The Highlands Hotel, formerly known as Maxims Genting between 2015 and 2020, is one of the seven accommodations in Genting Highlands, Ulu Selangor, Selangor, Malaysia. 

It is a 4-star hotel, and it houses the Maxims Club. It also houses the Genting Skyway upper station, the cable car ride station that links to the lower station located near Gohtong Jaya.

History

The hotel started operations as the Highlands Hotel. Later, it was renamed to Maxims Genting, after taking over the name of the current Genting Grand Hotel. In August 2020, Genting Group announced that it would be reverted to Highlands Hotel, ceasing Maxims Genting's name and Genting Reward members were notified on the 1st of September 2020.

Hotel
Highland Hotel Genting Highlands currently has 845 rooms and is exclusive for casino guests only. The hotel is located at the far end of Genting Highlands connected via Genting Grand.
In 2018, Maxims received a 'recommended' accreditation while its sister hotel, the adjacent Genting Grand was awarded with a 4-star rating from Forbes Travel Guide Star Ratings.

Philippines

Maxims Hotel is also present in the Philippines and it is a part of four hotels within the Resorts World Manila which was open on 28 August 2009. It is the first integrated resort in the country and is the sister resort to Resorts World Genting, Malaysia and Resorts World Sentosa, Singapore. The resort is located in Newport City, opposite the Ninoy Aquino International Airport Terminal 3, in Pasay, Metro Manila, Philippines.

See also
 Genting Grand
 Genting Skyway
 Resorts World Genting
 Resorts World Manila
 Resorts World Sentosa

References

External links

 

Genting Highlands
Hotels in Pahang
Hotels in Malaysia
Hotels established in 2009
Hotel buildings completed in 2009